Manuel Moisés Medori Martínez (born 8 February 1992) is a Venezuelan footballer who plays for Spanish club CD Lealtad as an attacking midfielder.

Club career
Born in Puerto la Cruz, Medori represented Boca Juniors as a youth. In January 2013 he joined Deportivo Anzoátegui, and made his first team debut late in the month by coming on as a substitute in a 0–3 home loss against Club Atlético Tigre for the Copa Libertadores championship.

In January 2015, after being rarely used, Medori was loaned to fellow Primera División club Tucanes de Amazonas for the remainder of the 2014–15 season. Upon returning, he scored his first senior goal on 29 August by netting his team's first in a 3–2 home win against Estudiantes de Mérida.

On 9 September 2017 Medori moved abroad for the first time in his career, signing for Spanish Segunda División B side CD Lealtad.

References

External links

1992 births
Living people
Venezuelan footballers
Association football midfielders
Venezuelan Primera División players
Deportivo Anzoátegui players
Segunda División B players
CD Lealtad players
Venezuelan expatriate footballers
Venezuelan expatriate sportspeople in Spain
Expatriate footballers in Spain
People from Puerto la Cruz